Georgina Mellor is a British actress best known for playing Anika Beevor in the ITV2 drama Footballers' Wives: Extra Time. She trained at Arden School of Theatre. Mellor appeared in Coronation Street in 2001 as a radiologist and in Hollyoaks on 3 February 2012 playing Jen a driving examiner to Neil Cooper.

External links
 

1978 births
Living people